Joshua Sommer is a Grand Prix motorcycle racer from Germany.

Career statistics

By season

Races by year
(key)

References

External links
 Profile on motogp.com

German motorcycle racers
Living people
1989 births
250cc World Championship riders